Funtua is a Local Government Area in Katsina State, Nigeria. Its headquarter is in the town of Funtua on the A126 highway.

It is one of the premier Local Governments in Nigeria created after the Local Governments reforms in 1976. It is the headquarters of the Katsina South senatorial district, which comprises eleven Local Governments: Bakori, Danja, Dandume, Faskari, Sabuwa, Kankara, Malumfashi, Kafur, Musawa, Matazu and Funtua.

Funtua has a conducive weather condition as it lies on the latitude and longitude 11°32′N and 7°19′E respectively. The city has an average temperature of 320C and humidity of 44%.

It has an area of 448 km² and a population of (225,571 at the 2006 census) and 570, 110 according to 2016 estimate. The Chairman is the official Head of Local Government. The inhabitants of the local government are predominantly Fulani, Their main occupations are trading, farming, and animal rearing.

Funtua is in the southern extreme end of Katsina State. It is the second largest city in the state after Katsina. It borders with Giwa Local Government of Kaduna State to the south, Bakori to the east, Danja to the southeast, Faskari to the Northwest, and Dandume to the West.

The postal code of the area is 830.

The source of the Sokoto River is located near Funtua.

Commerce and Industry 

Funtua has been an industrial and commercial centre since colonial days, presently it houses most of industries in the state. viz:
Funtua Textiles Limited, Jargaba Agric Processing Company that majored in oil mills, animal feeds etc., Northern Diaries, Funtua Burnt Bricks, Funtua Fertilizer  Blending Company, West African Cotton Company, Lumus Cotton Ginnery, Integrated Flour Mills, Funtua Bottling Company, Salama Rice Mills etc.

Transport
Funtua is served by a railway station on a branch on the western line of the national railway network and 4 major Federal Highways: Funtua-Birnin Gwari-Lagos Road, Funtua -Zamfara-Sokoto-Kebbi Road, Funtua-Yashe Road, and Funtua-Zaria Road, Funtua-Bakori-malunfashi-Dayi Road

Educational Institutions
Funtua currently has higher education institutions which accommodate students from all over the country, one is a remedial school known as Ahmadu Bello University School of Basic and Remedial Studies (SBRS), Funtua, which accommodates students from all (nineteen) 19 northern states of Nigeria, secondly it has three health technology colleges known as Muslim Community College of Health Science & Technology Funtua, College of Health and Environmental Sciences Funtua and Community School of Health Sciences and Technology Funtua Annex. Another Diploma awarding institution is Abdullahi Aminchi College of Advanced Studies Funtua which is registered to award Diploma certificates as it is affiliated to ABU Zaria, Imam Saidu College of Education, which awards NCE and Isma'ila Isah College of Advanced Studies which also award a Diploma Certificate in collaboration with Haicas Tsafe. Funtua housed a popular certificate awarding institution now preparing to start awarding Diploma known as College of Administration, Funtua.

Electricity and Water Supply
Funtua is served by 132KV transmission station of National Grid that comes from Mando receiving Station via Zaria and from there it extends to Gusau and terminates at Talata Mafara. It is important to note that the 132kv/33kv Transmission Station in Funtua is serving 9 Local Government areas out of the 11 Area Councils that make up of Funtua Senatorial District. While erratic power supply is a nationwide phenomenon, Funtua is not having such problem much because the town enjoys electricity for good 12–20 hours daily. So any interested investor can come and invest.

As for Water Supply; Funtua is blessed with 2 dams, namely; Mairuwa and Gwagwaye that served the city and some parts of Faskari and Bakori Area councils.

The 2 water bodies can be utilized for other things such as irrigation and hydro-power generation.

Also, there is A Songhai farm which is used for Training and cultivation of some farm products.

Funtua Inland Container Dry Port

Prominent People from Funtua
From the classical era to date, Funtua produced notable persons that accelerate in different fields of human endeavor.
Below is the list of some influential people from Funtua:

 Dr Mamman Shata Katsina

 Dr Aliyu Idris Funtua

See also
 Railway stations in Nigeria
 Ahmadu Bello University School of Basic and Remedial Studies (SBRS), Funtua

Some towns and villages in Funtua 
Dukke, Maigamji, Maska, Tudun Iya, Gardawa, Unguwar Hamida, Gwaigwaye, Dan Fili, Goya, 'Yar Randa, Unguwar Fadi, Unguwar Nunu, Gwauruwa, Rafin Dinya, Kaliyawa, Zamfarawa, Bakin Dutse, Unguwar Kankura, Unguwar Kwando, Cibauna, Lasanawa, Dukawa, Unguwar Biri, Kofar Yamma, Sabon Gari, Danlayi, Unguwar Tofa.

Also some areas to visit in the main town of Funtua:
BCJ, Jabiri, Ungwan Wanzamai, Bokori Road, Tafoki Road, GRA, Tudun Wada, Unguwan Magaji Makera, Sabon Layi, Bagari, Low-cost Yan Wanki, Zaria road.

References

Local Government Areas in Katsina State
Sokoto River